A dilution gene is any one of a number of genes that act to create a lighter coat color in living creatures. There are many examples of such genes:

General
Diluted coat colors have melanocytes, but vary from darker colors due to the concentration or type of these pigment-producing cells, not their absence. Pigment dilution, sometimes referred to as hypomelanism, has been called leucism, albinism (perfect, impartial, or dilute), ghosting, paling, and isabellinism.
Albinism describes a condition where pigment cells synthesize little or no pigment
Leucism describes a condition that creates loss of pigment cells

Cats
Cat coat genetics discusses many dilution genes in cats

Dogs
In dogs, a mutation of the MLPH locus known as the dilute gene causes eumelanin to lighten while pheomelanin remains almost unchanged. Dogs of some breeds with the dilute gene often suffer from Colour dilution alopecia (CDA).

Appearance 
Of the colour shades found in the coat of dogs, the light brown caused by pheomelanin is hardly affected. Black eumelanin is lightened to a grey called "blue". Chocolate brown eumelanine is lightened to the typical colour of the Weimaraner.

Genetics 
The dilute gene d is recessive to the wild type allele D. A gene test can be used to determine a dog's genotype concerning genes for pigmentation. In some dog breeds lightened by the dilute gene, the mutation d is associated with color dilution alopecia (CDA). Since not all breeds in which the gene occurs exhibit these problems, it is suspected that there may be a second previously unknown mutation of the MLPH gene.

Every dog has two alleles - one from the sire and one from the dam. The gene expression depends on the genotype: 

 DD: Both sire and dam have inherited the wild type allele. The coat is not lightened.
 Dd: Either sire or dam have inherited the allele for dilution. However, the dilution of colour is not visible in the phenotype - the dog has the same coat colour as a DD dog.
 dd: Sire and dam have inherited the allele for the dilute colour expression. The black areas of the coat are lightened to blue, dogs additionally lightened by the gene on the B locus take on the colour typical of the Weimaraner.

According to the Mendelian Rules, an average of 25% of the puppies receive the homozygous gene combination dd if both parents are genetic carriers.

Horses

Equine coat color genetics discusses color genes in horses, including a brief description of dilution genes
Equine coat color describes various colors in horses
Cream gene, describes the process for horses by which the cremello, perlino, smoky cream double-dilute colors are created as well as the buckskin, palomino and smoky black single dilute colors.
Dun gene describes another common dilution gene in horses
Champagne gene, describes a different and rarer dilution gene in horses that also creates cream coloring, pale skin with mottling and light-colored eyes.
Pearl gene, also called the "Barlink factor", is a recessive gene.  One copy of the allele has no effect on the coat color of black, bay or chestnut horses. Two copies on a chestnut horse produce a pale, uniform apricot color of body hair, mane and tail as well as pale skin. It also interacts with Cream dilution to produce "pseudo-double" Cream dilutes with pale skin and blue or green eyes.
Silver dapple gene, describes a dilution gene that works in a unique manner, lighting the mane and tail of a horse to a greater degree than the body color (opposite of most dilution genes, which act more strongly on the body color)
White (horse) describes several unique genetic processes that create truly white, not diluted, color in horses.
Gray (horse) explains the process of the gray gene, which lightens the coat over time, but is not a dilution gene.
Mushroom (horse) describes an unknown and unmapped theorized dilution gene dilutes red pigment in body color to a pale beige color.

References

See also
wikispecies:Felis sylvestris catus (cat)
wikispecies:Equus caballus (horse)

Horse coat colors